is a Japanese activist, journalist and writer. She teaches as professor in faculty of letters of Tokyo Kasei University.

As an activist she has been known as feminist, but since the 1980s active on warfare around aged people and their families. She is the Representative Secretary General of a Japan-based NPO, Women's Association for the Better Aging Society (WABAS).

She was graduated at Faculty of Letters in University of Tokyo in 1956. While she was officially at the seminar of Aesthetics and Art History, she studied journalism in the Institute of Newspaper  Researches, an institute of the university. She worked for Jiji Press, Gakken and Canon respectively. Since 1971 she has been a freelance writer and critic, mainly concerning feminism, warfare and education.

She contributed the piece "The sun and the shadow" to the 1984 anthology Sisterhood Is Global: The International Women's Movement Anthology, edited by Robin Morgan.

She ran for the governor of Tokyo in 2003 as an independent candidate and lost.

Publications
 Onna no ko no sodatekata : ai to jiritsu e no shuppatsu, 1978
 Onna no ningen kankeigaku, 1982
 Bringing up girls : start aiming at love and independence : status of women in Japan, 1985
 Sazae-san kara Ijiwaru bāsan e : onna kodomo no seikatsushi, 1993

References

External links 
 Profile of HIGUCHI, Keiko

1932 births
Living people
Canon (company) people
Academic staff of Tokyo Kasei University
Japanese critics
Japanese feminists
Japanese women journalists
Japanese women writers
Tokyo gubernatorial candidates
University of Tokyo alumni
Japanese political journalists
Japanese women critics